Yohann Capolungo (born May 13, 1988 in Auxerre) is a French footballer, who currently plays for McGill Redmen Soccer in Montreal, Quebec.

Early life
Capolungo was born in Auxerre and raised in Vallan, France.

Career 
He began his career in the youth side in 2006 for AJ Auxerre and moved on August 8, 2008 from the reserve team to McGill Redmen Soccer. In November 2009 was named in the All Canadian all star team.

Personal life 
Capolungo studies at McGill University,  Arts & Science (Economics & Math).

References

External links
 Skynet
 McGill

1988 births
Living people
French footballers
AJ Auxerre players
Ligue 1 players
Association football defenders
French people of Italian descent
French expatriate sportspeople in Canada